Olov Lambatunga was Archbishop of Uppsala from 1198 to 1206.

Biography
Little is known about Archbishop Olov. He was archbishop during the Papacy of Pope Innocent III  (1198–1216).
A couple of papal letters exist: In 1200, Pope Innocent III declared that Roman Catholic Church estates were free from government taxes and that clerics should not be subjected to the courts and judges of the government, but by bishops and prelates, as a step to separate the worldly and spiritual matters.

In the second letter, the Pope demands Olov  dismiss two bishops that Olov's predecessor Archbishop Petrus had appointed because they lacked proper heredity.  Absalon, Archbishop of Lund, requested the Pope to interact since the bishops  which Petrus had elected in 1196 were the sons of other priests which was not allowed according to the Canon law of the Catholic Church.
There is also a letter from Olov to the Pope  sent after Uppsala burnt in 1204. Olov asked for a new pallium, because his old had burnt. The request was granted.

References

Other sources 
 Åsbrink, Gustav & Westman, Knut B.  Svea rikes ärkebiskopar från 1164 till nuvarande tid (Stockholm: Bokförlaget Natur och Kultur,  1935)
 Paulsson, Göte  Annales Suecici medii aevi (Stockholm: Gleerup, 1974) 

Roman Catholic archbishops of Uppsala
13th-century Roman Catholic archbishops in Sweden